Bezirk Tulln is a district of the state of Lower Austria in Austria.

Municipalities
 Absdorf
 
 Atzenbrugg
 
 Fels am Wagram
 
 Grafenwörth
 
 Großriedenthal
 
 Großweikersdorf
 
 Judenau-Baumgarten
 
 Kirchberg am Wagram
 
 Klosterneuburg
 
 Königsbrunn am Wagram
 
 Königstetten
 Langenrohr
 
 Michelhausen
 
 Muckendorf-Wipfing
 
 Sieghartskirchen
 
 Sitzenberg-Reidling
 
 Sankt Andrä-Wördern
 
 Tulbing
 
 Tulln an der Donau
 
 Würmla
 
 Zeiselmauer-Wolfpassing
 
 Zwentendorf

Annexation
In 2017, Klosterneuburg became a part of the district when Wien-Umgebung District was defunct.

References

 
Districts of Lower Austria